When the Mad Aunts Arrive is a 1970 West German musical comedy film directed by Franz Josef Gottlieb and starring Rudi Carrell, Ilja Richter, and Chris Roberts. In one of a group of films during the era inspired by the cross-dressing plot of Charley's Aunt, two men end up at a Carinthian hotel resort disguised as females. This leads to confusion during their romantic pursuit of woman.

The film was shot on location in Munich and the Wörthersee in Austria. The film's sets were designed by Eberhard Schröder.

Cast

References

Bibliography

External links 
 

1970 films
1970s musical comedy films
German musical comedy films
West German films
1970s German-language films
Films directed by Franz Josef Gottlieb
Films scored by Gerhard Heinz
Constantin Film films
Cross-dressing in film
1970 comedy films
1970s German films